Zhukovo is a rural locality (a village) in Kichmengskoye Rural Settlement, Kichmengsko-Gorodetsky District, Vologda Oblast, Russia. The population was 20 as of 2002.

Geography 
Zhukovo is located 11 km northeast of Kichmengsky Gorodok (the district's administrative centre) by road. Zasosenye is the nearest rural locality.

References 

Rural localities in Kichmengsko-Gorodetsky District